Who Are You? (Italian: Chi sei tu?) is a 1939 Italian comedy film directed by Gino Valori and starring María Denis, Antonio Centa and Lilia Dale.

Cast
 María Denis as Francesca  
 Antonio Centa as Maurizio / l'attore Man Rowel  
 Lilia Dale as Lorenza  
 Guido Barbarisi as Michele  
 Cesare Zoppetti as Il nonno  
 Adele Mosso as La nonna 
 Giovanni Ardizzone 
 Vasco Creti 
 Aedo Galvani 
 Pino Locchi 
 Elettra Terzolo

References

Bibliography 
 Ricci, Steven. Cinema and Fascism: Italian Film and Society, 1922–1943. University of California Press, 2008.

External links 
 

1939 comedy films
Italian comedy films
1939 films
1930s Italian-language films
Films directed by Gino Valori
Italian black-and-white films
1930s Italian films